The Marche regional election of 1975 took place on 15 June 1975.

Events
The Italian Communist Party was the largest party, narrowly ahead of Christian Democracy. However, for a trick of the electoral law, it obtained less seats. So, after the election, Christian Democrat Adriano Ciaffi formed a government including also the Italian Socialist Party, the Italian Democratic Socialist Party and the Italian Republican Party (organic Centre-left). Emidio Massi took over from Ciaffi in 1978.

Results

Source: Ministry of the Interior

References

Elections in Marche
1975 elections in Italy